The Keirle House is located at 3017 Mormon Street in the Florence neighborhood of North Omaha, Nebraska. Built in 1905 in the classic box style popular in the Midwest, the Keirle House was designated an Omaha Landmark in 1997.

The Keirle House is a Midwest "classic box" with Queen Anne and classical revival details. It was built to face the town square of Winter Quarters, which the Mormons originally laid out in 1846.

Uta Halee Girls Village executive offices.

References

External links
Modern photo of the Keirle House.

Houses in Omaha, Nebraska
Landmarks in North Omaha, Nebraska
Omaha Landmarks
Houses completed in 1905
1905 establishments in Nebraska